Herefordshire and Worcestershire Health and Care NHS Trust was established in Worcestershire, England, on 1 July 2011 to manage  services previously managed by Worcestershire Primary Care NHS Trust's Provider Arm, as well as the mental health services that were managed by Worcestershire Mental Health Partnership NHS Trust.

The Trust provides community hospitals and community based nursing and therapy services across Worcestershire. On April 1st 2020 the Trust took over the delivery of mental health and learning disability services in Herefordshire in addition to their existing mental health and learning disability services in Worcestershire.  

The Trust currently employees around 5,000 staff across the two counties. It was named by the Health Service Journal as one of the top hundred NHS trusts to work for in 2015.  At that time it had 3127 full-time equivalent staff and a sickness absence rate of 4.36%. 69% of staff recommend it as a place for treatment and 58% recommended it as a place to work.

In 2017 it was named as a Global Digital Exemplar for Mental Health in the report Next Steps on the NHS, produced as part of the implementation of the Five Year Forward View.  It has been given up to £5 million of national funding  to develop new digital systems to support mental health patients.  It made a three year agreement with Cambio Healthcare Systems in 2018 to create  what was described as "a disruptive clinical solution for community and mental health trusts".  This involves an integrated solution for e-prescribing and medicines administration and clinical decision support systems designed for mental healthcare. It will use FHIR standards which would let other NHS trusts link any third-party applications for secure access to their patient records.

It is part of the Herefordshire and Worcestershire sustainability and transformation partnership.

On 2nd November 2020, the organisations name was updated from Worcestershire Health and Care NHS Trust to Herefordshire and Worcestershire Health and Care NHS Trust to better reflect the geography of NHS services they deliver.

See also 
 Healthcare in Worcestershire
 List of NHS trusts

References

External links 
 
 CQC inspection reports

Community health NHS trusts
Health in Herefordshire
Health in Worcestershire
NHS mental health trusts